The 2013–14 Pittsburgh Panthers men's basketball team represented the University of Pittsburgh during the 2013–14 NCAA Division I men's basketball season. The team played its home games at the Petersen Events Center in Pittsburgh, Pennsylvania.  This was Pittsburgh's inaugural season in the Atlantic Coast Conference, having moved from the Big East Conference. Pitt had been in the Big East since 1982. They finished the season 26–10, 11–7 in ACC play to finish in fifth place. They advanced to the semifinals of the ACC tournament where they lost to Virginia. They received an at-large bid to the NCAA tournament where they defeated Colorado in the second round before losing in the third round to Florida.

Roster

Schedule
Pitt released its 2013–14 conference opponents on April 23, 2013. They will have home games against Clemson, Duke, Florida State, Maryland, North Carolina State, Virginia, Virginia Tech, Wake Forest and Syracuse. Away games will consist of Clemson, Boston College, Maryland, Miami, Georgia Tech, North Carolina, North Carolina State, Notre Dame and Syracuse.

On May 21 it was announced that the Panthers will participate as one of the four hosts in the 2013 Legends Classic alongside Houston, Stanford, and Texas Tech. Pittsburgh will host a pair of regional round games, and will then travel to Brooklyn to participate in the championship round with the other three hosts on November 25–26 at the Barclays Center.

|-
!colspan=12 style="background:#091C44; color:#CEC499;" | Scrimmage

|-
!colspan=12 style="background:#091C44; color:#CEC499;" | Exhibition

|-
!colspan=12 style="background:#091C44; color:#CEC499;" | Regular season

|-
!colspan=9 style="background:#091C44; color:#CEC499;"| ACC Tournament

|-
!colspan=9 style="background:#091C44; color:#CEC499;"| NCAA tournament

Rankings

References

Pittsburgh Panthers men's basketball seasons
Pittsburgh
Pittsburgh
Pittsburgh Pan
Pittsburgh Pan